The FIBT World Championships 1930 took place in Montreux, Switzerland at the Caux-sur-Montreux hotel. A four-man competition was held.

Four man bobsleigh

Medal table

References
4-Man bobsleigh World Champions

1930
1930 in Swiss sport
1930 in bobsleigh
International sports competitions hosted by Switzerland
Bobsleigh in Switzerland